Maxim or Maksim may refer to:

Entertainment
Maxim (magazine), an international men's magazine
 Maxim (Australia), the Australian edition
 Maxim (India), the Indian edition
Maxim Radio, Maxim magazine's radio channel on Sirius Satellite Radio 
Maxim, a fictional ship in the manga and anime series One Piece
Maxim, the hero of the video game Lufia II: Rise of the Sinistrals and its remake, Lufia: Curse of the Sinistrals

Literature and language
A species of adage, aphorism, or saying that expresses a general moral rule, especially a philosophical maxim
Maxims (Old English poems), examples of gnomic poetry
Maximes (1665–78) of François de La Rochefoucauld (1613–80)

Organizations
Mary Maxim, craft and needlework mail-order company in Canada
Maxim Brewery, brewing company in England
Maxim's Catering, chain of caterers, restaurants, and fast food shops in Hong Kong
Maxim Healthcare Services, medical staffing and home healthcare company
Maxim Institute, public policy think tank in New Zealand
Maxim Integrated, manufacturer of analog and mixed signal integrated circuits
Maxim Motors, former manufacturer of firefighting apparatus located in Middleborough, Massachusetts
Maxim's Paris, Parisian restaurant of the Belle Epoque

People
Maxim (given name)
Maxim (surname)
Maxim., taxonomic author abbreviation of Karl Maximovich (1827–1891), Russian botanist
Maksim, Metropolitan of all Rus, Metropolitan of Kiev (1283–1305)
Maksim, Bulgarian Patriarch (1914–2012), Patriarch of the Bulgarian Orthodox Church
Maksim, Serbian Patriarch (d. 1680), Patriarch of the Serbian Orthodox Church (1655-1674)
Maksim Branković (d. 1516), Serbian Orthodox Metropolitan of Belgrade and Syrmia

Other uses
Maxim, New Jersey, an unincorporated community in Monmouth County, New Jersey, United States
Maxim (philosophy), a principle that an individual uses in making a decision
Maxim (coffee), the first American brand of freeze-dried coffee, made by General Foods
Maxim gun, the first self-acting machine gun
Maxim Cup, South Korean Go competition
Maxim DL, software package created by Cyanogen Imaging 
Maxim Wien, brothel in Vienna, Austria
Legal maxim, certain guiding principles of law and jurisprudence
Pragmatic maxim, maxim of logic formulated by Charles Sanders Peirce
SilencerCo Maxim 50,  a muzzle-loading rifle that includes an integrated sound suppressor

See also
Aphorism
Maxima (disambiguation)
Maxime (disambiguation)